Ľubietová is a village in central Slovakia. Originally an ancient mining town, it is known for precious minerals.

Geography
Ľubietová is part of the Banská Bystrica District in the Banská Bystrica Region. It is situated 25 km east from the town of Banská Bystrica. It lies at an altitude of 491 metres and covers an area of 61 km². The geographic center of Slovakia, the Hrb mountain, is located near the village.

History
Thanks to abundant deposits of copper and less rich deposits of iron ore, Ľubietová became soon an important center of medieval mining industry. It was granted the status of a royal town in 1379 by Louis the Great and German miners settled here. As one of the most important centers of Protestant Reformation in the country, the town created the Protestant "League of Seven Mining Towns" together with Banská Belá, Banská Bystrica, Banská Štiavnica, Kremnica, Nová Baňa, and Pukanec. In 1692, the first modern blast furnace in the Kingdom of Hungary was built in Ľubietová. Due to the decline of the mining industry in the 18th century, the settlement lost its urban character and became a village.

Minerals

Ľubietová is famous for precious minerals that can be found inside the ancient mines. For example, Libethenite was discovered there in 1823 and is named after the German name of the village (Libethen). Euchroite was also described for the first time in Ľubietová. The list of interesting minerals, mostly created by weathering of copper ores, also includes azurite and malachite.

Population
In 2013, Ľubietová had a population of 1160 inhabitants. According to the 2001 census, 98.5% of inhabitants were Slovaks. The religious makeup was 60.2% Lutherans, 27% Roman Catholics, and 8.2% with no religious affiliation.

Famous people
Vavrinec Dunajský, sculptor

External links
Municipality of Ľubietová

References

Villages and municipalities in Banská Bystrica District